Orsenigo is an Italian surname. Notable people with the surname include:

Cesare Orsenigo, Vatican diplomat
Giovanni Battista Orsenigo, Italian monk and dentist
Simone da Orsenigo, Italian architect

Italian-language surnames